Badeh (also Romanized as Bādeh; also known as Bādeh-ye Ābestān and Bādeh-e Bostān) is a village in Zagheh Rural District, Zagheh District, Khorramabad County, Lorestan Province, Iran. At the 2006 census, its population was 557, in 113 families.

References 

Towns and villages in Khorramabad County